Corythoichthys ocellatus, the ocellated pipefish or  orange-spotted pipefish, is a marine pipefish found in the western Pacific Ocean. Belonging to the family Syngnathidae, it grows up to 10 cm long, and is found in the first 12 m of the warm tropical seas off the coast of Australia. Ovoviviparous, the male carries the eggs in a brood pouch found under the tail.

References

External links
 

ocellatus
Ovoviviparous fish
Fish described in 1953